Norman King (7 August 1914 – c. December 1997) was an English international lawn bowler.

Bowls career
He won a gold medal in the fours with Cliff Stroud, Ted Hayward and Peter Line at the 1972 World Outdoor Bowls Championship in Worthing.

He also won two Commonwealth Games medals; a gold in the 1958 British Empire and Commonwealth Games in Cardiff and another gold in the pairs with Peter Line at the 1970 British Commonwealth Games in Edinburgh.

He won the National Championship title in 1957.

Personal life
He was an agent and salesman by trade and took up bowls in 1942 during wartime holidays.

References

1914 births
1997 deaths
English male bowls players
Commonwealth Games medallists in lawn bowls
Commonwealth Games gold medallists for England
Bowls World Champions
Bowls players at the 1958 British Empire and Commonwealth Games
Bowls players at the 1970 British Commonwealth Games
Medallists at the 1958 British Empire and Commonwealth Games
Medallists at the 1970 British Commonwealth Games